Catherine Florence Maria Regina Digovich (born September 13, 1984) is the founder and director of operations of the Botswana-based nonprofit Positive Innovation for the Next Generation (PING), which develops mobile health and education tools and helps mentor and teach local youth IT skills. She is also the founder and CEO of Develo, the for-profit arm of PING based in the Silicon Valley that develops mobile applications for emerging markets targeted at telecoms to help them diversify their revenue and provide value-added services to businesses and the end-user as well as the informal market sector.

Biography 

Digovich grew up in Palo Alto, California, and graduated from Princeton University in 2008. She played on the Princeton Tigers women's basketball team from 2003 to 2005 and 2006 to 2008 at forward. Digovich took a gap year from Princeton in 2005–06 and left the basketball team for the last time in January 2008. In four years, she played 67 games and averaged 7.1 points and 4.9 rebounds.

Princeton statistics

Source

Awards and accolades 

In October 2013, Digovich received the Global Laureate Fellowship for her involvement with Positive Innovation for the Next Generation. She traveled to São Paulo, Brazil to receive the prestigious award only received by twenty young entrepreneurs worldwide annually.

References

External links
pingsite.org
Develo-ping.com

1984 births
Living people
American women chief executives
American health care chief executives
American nonprofit chief executives
Princeton Tigers women's basketball players
Sportspeople from Palo Alto, California
Basketball players from California
Forwards (basketball)